Richard Thomas Chase (February 15, 1904 – February 2 1988)  was an American folklorist and an authority on English-American folklore.

Biography

Career 
Chase compiled and edited several books of folktales and folk games (especially Appalachian), including:
Grandfather Tales: American-English Folk Tales (1948), 
Hullabaloo, and Other Singing Folk Games (1949) and The Jack Tales 
The Jack Tales: told by RM Ward and his kindred in the Beech Mountain section of Western North Carolina and by other descendants of Council Harmon (1803-1896) elsewhere in the southern mountains; with three tales from Wise County, Virginia. 
Old Songs and Singing Games 
The Complete Tales of Uncle Remus 
American Folktales and Songs and other examples of English-American traditions as preserved in the Appalachian Mountains and elsewhere in the United States. 
various spoken word recordings including Richard Chase Tells Three Grandfather Tales.

Personal life
Chase was born near Huntsville, Alabama and graduated Antioch College in 1929, he lived in California from 1964 to 1975 and was a regular at the Southern Renaissance Pleasure Faire created by Ron and Phyllis Patterson, in Ventura, CA, where he is remembered for holding court under a large oak tree. He introduced English Country Dancing to the faire, bringing a group of his students from Claremont College. Chase had one daughter, Ann Gay Chase Applegate.

References

External links
 

American folklorists
1904 births
1988 deaths
Collectors of fairy tales